Galimov is a surname of Russian origin. Notable people with this surname include:

Aleksandr Galimov (born 2000), Russian footballer
Alexander Galimov (1985–2011), Russian ice hockey player
Ansel Galimov (born 1991), Russian ice hockey player
Artyom Galimov (born 1999), Russian ice hockey player
Emil Galimov (born 1992), Russian ice hockey player
Erik Galimov (1936–2020), Russian geochemist
Marat Galimov (born 1964), Russian footballer
Nail Galimov (born 1966), Russian footballer
Rais Galimov (born 1946), Russian sailor
Stanislav Galimov (born 1988), Russian ice hockey player
Marat Galimov (born 1964), Russian footballer